The Pajama Men are Shenoah Allen and Mark Chavez, an American comedy duo of character comics from Albuquerque, New Mexico. They have won awards including the Barry Award at the Melbourne International Comedy Festival in 2009, and Best Newcomer and Best of the Fest at The Sydney Comedy Festival in 2009.

They began performing together as Sabotage, creating shows including Sabotage 2001 and In Fine Form. Around 2004, they changed their name to "The Pajama Men", and have since performed shows including Stop Not Going, Versus vs. Versus, The Last Stand to Reason, In the Middle of No One, Just the Two of Each of Us, and 2 Man 3 Musketeers.

History
Allen and Chavez, who were both the youngest children in their respective families, met in La Cueva High School at an audition for an improv group in 1993 and have "been doing stupid things together ever since".

They began performing together in 2000, under the name Sabotage, at Tricklock Company's Reptilian Lounge Late Night Cabaret. Their first three original shows premiered at the Tricklock Company Performance Space in Albuquerque, New Mexico. In 2004, they took a show to the Edinburgh Fringe Festival, where they were nominated for the Perrier Best Newcomer Award. Since then, they have performed on the Fringe Festival circuit in Canada, and at the Melbourne International Comedy Festival, the Sydney Comedy Festival, the Edinburgh Fringe Festival, and more. In 2010, they had a sold-out run in London, England where they became the highest-selling act ever to play The Soho Theatre.

They have also created an animated series entitled One Square Mile of Earth, in collaboration with Jeff Drew and Jeff Drew Pictures. This series was part of the short film program for Tromadance 2009 and the Sundance Film Festival 2010.

Reviews
The Sunday Times and The Financial Times gave The Pajama Men's In The Middle of No One 4 out of 5 stars in 2012. The Washington Post gave it positive reviews as well.

The Guardian gave their 2012 Edinburgh Festival performance 4 stars

Media

Television
One Square Mile of Earth (2009)

Films
The Pajama Men - The Last Stand to Reason (2011)
The Pajama Men - In The Middle Of No One (2012)
The Pajama Men - Just The Two Of Each Of Us (2013)

Awards
2004: Perrier Best Newcomer Award at the Edinburgh Fringe Festival for In Fine Form (Nominated) (as Sabotage)
2004: Dubble Act Award at the Edinburgh Fringe Festival for In Fine Form (Nominated) (as Sabotage)
2005: Dubble Act Award at the Edinburgh Fringe Festival for Stop Not Going
2009: Barry Award for most outstanding festival show at the Melbourne International Comedy Festival for Versus vs. Versus 
2009: Best Newcomer at Time Out Sydney Comedy Awards for Versus vs. Versus 
2009: Best of the Fest at Time Out Sydney Comedy Awards for Versus vs. Versus
2010: Best Sketch or Character Act for the Chortle Awards for The Last Stand to Reason (Nominated) 
2010: Best Show for the Chortle Awards for The Last Stand to Reason (Nominated)

External links
Official Site

References

People from Albuquerque, New Mexico
American comedy duos
Culture of Albuquerque, New Mexico